Adasa Cookey (born Adasa Rawlinson Cookeygam) is a Nigerian-born music video director, cinematographer, commercial director, colourist, and filmmaker. He works and directs for Squareball Media Productions Limited where he is also the Chief Executive Officer of the company.

Early life
Adasa was born on October 21, 1981 in Port Harcourt, Rivers State, Nigeria. He spent his early childhood in Port Harcourt, where he attended secondary school at Bereton College and Federal Government College. Thereafter, he proceeded to study at Rivers State University of Science and Technology and earned a Bachelor of Technology in Architecture.

Career
Adasa left his customer care representative job in 2010 to switch his passion in video editing and directly. 
He has directed the music videos of music artistes like Davido, Burna Boy, Simi, Adekunle Gold, D'Prince, and Don Jazzy.

Selected videography
Burna Boy – Like To Party (2013) 
D'Prince – Goody Bag (2013) 
Ketchup- Show Me Yuh Rozay (2013)
Mavins All Stars - Adaobi  (2014) 
DJ Xclusive ft Davido  – Wo Le  (2015) 
Adekunle Gold - Sade (2015) 
Adekunle Gold - Ready  (2016)
Ric Hassani -Only You (2017)
Orezi-Cooking Pot (2017) 
Idahams-Toast (2017)
Simi – Selense (2019) 
Simi – Ayo (2019)
Simi – Duduke  (2020) 
Simi ft Patoranking – Jericho (2019) 
Bebe Cool ft Rudeboy -  Feeling (2020)
Runtown ft. Bella Shmurda, Darkovibes – Body Riddim (Video) (2020) 
Simi ft. Adekunle Gold – By You  (2019)
Praiz – Madu (2020) 
Niniola – Addicted  (2020)
Wande Coal ft. Wale – Again (Remix)  (2020)
Wande Coal – Again (2020)
Idahams-Billion Dollar (2019) 
Idahams-Ada (2020)
Idahams-Enter My Eye (2020)
Stonebwoy ft. Zlatan- Critical (2021)

Awards & Nominations

References

External links

Living people
Nigerian film directors
Nigerian cinematographers
Nigerian music video directors
1981 births